Bang Min-ja(Korean:방민자) (born ) is a South Korean wheelchair curler.

She participated at the 2018 Winter Paralympics where South Korean team finished on fourth place.

Wheelchair curling teams and events

References

External links 

BANG Min-Ja - Athlete Profile - World Para Nordic Skiing - Live results | International Paralympic Committee
 Video: 

Living people
1962 births
South Korean female curlers
South Korean wheelchair curlers
Paralympic wheelchair curlers of South Korea
Wheelchair curlers at the 2018 Winter Paralympics